The sixth season of NCIS: Los Angeles an American police procedural drama television series originally aired on CBS from September 29, 2014, through May 18, 2015. The season was produced by Shane Brennan Productions and CBS Television Studios, with Shane Brennan as showrunner and executive producer.  This season saw the show move from Tuesday nights, where it used to follow NCIS to Monday nights.

Cast and characters

Main
 Chris O'Donnell as G. Callen, NCIS Senior Special Agent (SSA) of the Office of Special Projects (O.S.P.) in Los Angeles
 Daniela Ruah as Kensi Blye, NCIS Junior Special Agent
 Eric Christian Olsen as Marty Deeks, L.A.P.D.Detective Liaison To NCIS
 Barrett Foa as Eric Beale, NCIS Technical Operator
 Renée Felice Smith as Nell Jones, NCIS Special Agent and Intelligence Analyst
 Miguel Ferrer as Owen Granger, NCIS Assistant Director
 Linda Hunt as Henrietta Lange, NCIS Supervisory Special Agent and Operations Manager
 LL Cool J as Sam Hanna, NCIS Senior Agent, second in command

Recurring
 Rocky Carroll as Leon Vance, NCIS Director stationed in Washington D.C.
 Vyto Ruginis as Arkady Kolcheck
 Peter Cambor as Nate Getz, NCIS Special Agent
 Aunjanue Ellis as Michelle Hanna, "Quinn", Sam's wife
 Mercedes Mason as Talia Del Campo
 Elizabeth Bogush as Joelle Taylor
 Alicia Coppola as Lisa Rand

Guests
 Julie Chen as Nancy Kelly
 Ernie Reyes Jr. as Jemadar Thapa
 Gerald McRaney as Hollace Kilbride, Retired Navy Admiral

Episodes

Production

Development
NCIS: Los Angeles was renewed for a sixth season on March 13, 2014.

Broadcast
NCIS: Los Angeles premiered on September 29, 2014. NCIS: Los Angeles moved from a previous timeslot Tuesday at 9:00pm to a Monday timeslot at 10:00pm.

Reception
NCIS: Los Angeles ranked #27 with a total of 11.72 million viewers for the 2014–15 U.S. network television season.

Ratings

Home video release

References

General

External links
 
 

2014 American television seasons
2015 American television seasons
06